Dorothy Ruth Bain  (born 1964) is a Scottish advocate who has served as Lord Advocate since 2021. She is the second woman to hold the office after Elish Angiolini. Bain previously served as the Principal Advocate Depute from 2009 to 2011, the first woman to hold the prosecutorial position in Scotland.

Born in Edinburgh, Scotland, Bain attended the University of Aberdeen School of Law, graduating with an LLB and a Diploma in Legal Practice. In 1994, she became an advocate and in 2007 she was appointed Queen's Counsel, now King's Counsel. Bain served as an Advocate Depute in the Crown Office from 2002 to 2011 and was appointed the first female Principal Advocate Depute from 2009 to 2011. In 2008, she was commissioned to report on the prosecution of sex crimes in Scotland, the outcome of which led to the formation of Scotland's National Sex Crimes Unit in 2009. She returned to private practice in 2011.

First Minister Nicola Sturgeon nominated Bain for Lord Advocate and on 22 June 2021 she was sworn into office at the Court of Session with Ruth Charteris KC, Solicitor General. It is the first time both positions have been held by women at the same time. In October 2022, she argued the Scottish Government's unsuccessful case in the UK Supreme Court on the legality of a second referendum on Scottish Independence.

Early life 
Dorothy Ruth Bain was born in 1964 in Edinburgh, Scotland. One of five children, Bain's mother was a shorthand typist and her father was a postman. She attended the University of Aberdeen, where her older sister, Helen, was studying medicine and then her younger sister, Elizabeth, would later study psychology. They were the first generation in her family to attend university. She earned an LLB degree and a Diploma in Legal Practice.

Legal career

Early career 
Completing her traineeship with TF Reid & Donaldson, a law firm in Paisley, Bain was still unsure of where she wanted to take her legal career. After working for Dundas & Wilson, she began her career as an advocate in 1994. She worked in civil practice from 1994 until 2002.

Advocate Depute; 2002 to 2009 
From 2002 to 2011 she served as an Advocate Depute working within the Crown Office and Procurator Fiscal Service. In 2008, she was commissioned by the Lord Advocate, Elish Angiolini, and the Solicitor General, Frank Muholland, to report on and make recommendations on the prosecution of sex crimes in Scotland, the outcome of which led to the formation of Scotland's National Sexual Crimes Unit.

Principal Advocate Depute; 2009 to 2011 

In June 2009, Bain became the first and highest-ranking female to hold the prosecutorial position in Scotland, as Principal Advocate Depute. She became known for her prosecution of high-profile cases such as the serial killer Peter Tobin, the Operation Algebra case which resulted in the conviction of (then) the largest paedophile ring in the UK, as well the prosecution of four members of a drug gang for murder, and a wide-ranging 2009 child pornography case.

Bain has been instructed in cases at all levels, including the Court of Session, Court of Criminal Appeal, High Court of Justiciary, Supreme Court of the United Kingdom, and the European Court of Human Rights.

In 2011, following the promotion of Frank Mulholland QC as Lord Advocate, Bain was seen as a likely contender to succeed Mulholland as Solicitor General. However, she was not nominated by Alex Salmond and the office was given to Lesley Thomson.

Private Practice 
Bain returned to private practice in 2011. She represented the family of a victim of the 2014 Glasgow bin lorry crash.   She also represented the petitioner in a petition to the Nobile Officium of the High Court of Justiciary which held that where an accused person in criminal proceedings seeks to admit evidence of sexual history, the complainer must be told of the content of the application; invited to comment on the accuracy of any allegations within it; and be asked to state any objections which they might have to the granting of the application. She was Counsel to the Investigatory Powers Tribunal in Scotland and Chair of the Police Appeals Tribunal.

Lord Advocate

Appointment 

On 16 June 2021, it was announced that Bain would be nominated by Nicola Sturgeon, subject to the approval of the Scottish Parliament, to take up office as Lord Advocate, succeeding James Wolffe. Her appointment as Lord Advocate was approved by the Scottish Parliament the following day. She was sworn into office at the Court of Session, alongside Ruth Charteris KC as Solicitor General, on 22 June. On 10 November, she was appointed to the Privy Council earning the title 'The Right Honourable'.

Tenure 
Bain has promised to act "independently" and has stated she will assist the First Minister over a review of the functions of Lord Advocate. She is likely to defend the Scottish Parliament over the Scottish Government's second Scottish independence referendum proposal.

Drug policy 
In September 2021, Bain made a statement to Parliament over a "radical" reform of the drug policy in Scotland, branded “de facto decriminalisation”, in an effort to tackle the country's drug crisis. In July 2021, the National Record of Scotland reported a 5% increase in drug-related deaths in 2020. The new policy announced would mean people caught with Class A drugs will be offered a police warning instead of being referred to prosecutors. This will extend the existing law for the possession of Class B and Class C drugs. Bain told MSPs: “I have considered the review and I have decided that an extension of the recorded police warning guidelines to include possession offences for Class A drugs is appropriate. Police officers may therefore choose to issue a recorded police warning for simple possession offences for all classes of drugs.”Many opposition parties argued against the law change, highlighting cities across Scotland, including Dundee, where "communities are devastated by the failures of the ‘war on drugs’ approach”. Others criticised the policy change should have been debated by the Parliament. The Scottish Conservatives' justice spokesman, Jamie Greene, insisted “nothing that has been said today will stop drug deaths” and the only way to tackle Scotland's drug deaths crisis is to “improve access to treatment and rehabilitation, not to dilute how seriously we treat possession of deadly drugs like heroin, crystal meth and crack cocaine.”

In November 2021, Bain told the Scottish Parliament's justice committee, she would consider a “precise and specific” proposal for a drugs consumption rooms in Scotland. Her predecessor, James Wolffe, ruled out the idea of consumption rooms where drug users could take illegal substances in supervised conditions. Bain told the committee: “The potential offences which may be committed in any particular consumption facility will depend on the individual scheme envisaged, the policies and processes within the individual scheme, and the actual behaviours of both the operators and the users. And so the Lord Advocate couldn't actually, as a matter of law, whether through policy, or otherwise, decriminalise conduct which was by law criminal. Nor could immunity from prosecution be granted in advance."

Proposed referendum on Scottish Independence 

In June 2022, the First Minister launched her government's campaign to hold a second referendum on Scottish Independence. In the negotiations for the 2014 Scottish Independence referendum, the UK Government granted the powers for the Scottish Government to hold a referendum. However, the current UK administration has blocked Nicola Sturgeon's proposal for another referendum. The following month, Sturgeon announced the referendum would be held on 19 October 2023 and sought the Prime Minister to consent to the vote by signing a section 30 order, a move that Downing Street has refused to comply. In response, Sturgeon asked Bain to consider referring the matter to the Supreme Court of the United Kingdom to rule if the Scottish Government has the power to host a referendum without the Government of the United Kingdom's approval, this request has since been granted.

Bain advised the Government that holding a referendum, without a Section 30 order from Westminster, would "likely be unlawful". She wrote to the Supreme Court to rule whether Holyrood has the legal powers to hold a referendum without the UK Government's approval. Michael Keating, a political scientist, suggested Bain had doubts about the legality of the referendum and in order to keep her political neutrality, she sought to ask the court for a ruling.

On 22 July 2022, Bain published the legal argument for a second referendum. She will go before judges at the Supreme Court in October 2022, where she will argue the case for a referendum. Bain emphasised holding a referendum itself was "advisory" and would have no legal impact on the future of the union and argued it would be inappropriate for the court to "speculate" on what actions the Government would take after a referendum.

Personal life 
Bain is married to Alan Turnbull, Lord Turnbull, a Scottish judge in the Court of Session’s Inner House.

References

External links
 at Ampersand Stable of Advocates (archived on the Wayback Machine on 16 June 2021)

Scottish King's Counsel
Living people
Alumni of the University of Aberdeen
Scottish women lawyers
Members of the Faculty of Advocates
20th-century Scottish lawyers
21st-century Scottish lawyers
20th-century women lawyers
21st-century women lawyers
20th-century Scottish women
Lord Advocates
1964 births
Lawyers from Edinburgh